Manapparai Murukku  is a special variety of murukku, a snack named after the town of  Manapparai in Tiruchirappalli district in the Indian state of Tamil Nadu.

Overview
The snack's name Murukku derives from the Tamil word for "twisted", which refers to its shape. The brain behind the industry was Krishna Iyer. Before Independence, he started this as a cottage industry, Later it was takeover by Immigrant peoples from Usilambatti, Madurai(Dt). From 1951 Meesaikkarar alias Kasimaya Thevar [one of the migrant] and also his relatives had applying special techniques and add more taste like neither sweet nor spicy, and makes the murukku famous as 'Manapparai Murukku'. Once when Mahatma Gandhi  came to the Manapparai Railway junction, After eating Manapparai Murukku, he happily told his friends about its taste. It was the ideal South Indian travel snack.

Ingredients such as rice flour, cumin seeds, gingelly, asafetida, ajwain (omam), salt, water and oil are necessary to make this murukku. All ingredients should be mixed with flour. Then water is added little by little, kneading it into a thick batter. After that it has to be patted by the murukku maker and rotated to form coils. It has to be set aside for two minutes. Then it has to be fried in oil, then set aside again, and the process repeated. It has to be stored in an air-tight container. To add richness, butter or ghee could be added.

Industry
This murukku is sold not only in all parts of Tamil Nadu but also exported to other states of India and overseas. Around 150 to 250 families and cottage industries and at least 10 companies make the snack. In 2010, the Tamil Nadu government applied for a geographical indication tag for Manapparai Murukku. The GI tag would help more than 400 families who depend on this work.

See also
Tamil cuisine

References

Tamil cuisine
Indian snack foods